Klossia is the scientific name of two genera of organisms and may refer to:

Klossia (alveolate), a genus of apicomplexans in the family Adeleidae
Klossia (plant), a genus of plants in the family Rubiaceae